Chudanga Gada, formerly known as Sarangagarh, is a fort in Odisha state of India. The fort is situated at a latitude of 20°25’16" north and longitude of 85°48’25" east and at an elevation of 100 feet above sea level. It is about 14 km north of Bhubaneswar in the village Baranga of Cuttack tehsil and district. It is 9.00 km south-west of Cuttack near the Baranga Railway station of the East-coast railways. The site can also be approached from Bhubaneswar through the Bhubanesvar-Cuttack road via Nandankanan and Baranga. From Baranga one has to negotiate a distance of 1.5 km north of Sitaram chowk to reach the site that is situated on the right bank of the river Prachi. The landmarks around the fort are Zoological Park of Nandankanan on its north at a distance of 1.5 km, river Prachi (otherwise known as Baranga River) on its south at a distance of 0.5 km and Chandaka forest closely attached to the fort on its west, and Baranga Police station on its east at a distance of 0.5 km. The site has ruins and vestiges extending over an area more than 1000 acres of land within a fortification made of large sized dressed laterite blocks.

Traditions & legends
According to the Madalapanji, the fort was constructed by Lalatendu Kesari of Kesari dynasty (otherwise known as Somavamsis) when it was known as Sarangagarh, because the area had large number of water bodies filled with lotus and in Sanskrit, Saranga means lotus. Later on Baraha Kesari renovated the fort, which was captured by Ganga king Chodaganga Deva after defeating Karna Deva, the last ruler of the Somavamsi dynasty in 1110 AD. There after the fort of Sarangagada became known as Chudangagada after the name of the victor Anantavarman Chodaganga Deva.

=Ownership=*
This is a protected monument of Archaeological Survey of India notification no. S.R.C 303 dated 23.02.1951

Age
The fort dates back to 9th century A.D. This has been inferred from the records of Lalatendu Kesari.

Property Type
i) Precinct/ Building/ Structure/Landscape/Site/Tank : Archaeological site
ii) Subtype: Metropolitan establishment
iii) Typology: Fort

Property use
i) Abandoned/ in use: Abandoned
ii) Past use: Military cantonment and royal residential complex

Significance
The fort was constructed by the Keshari dynasty. It comes under the protected monuments of the Archaeological survey of India.

Physical description

Surrounding
The fort is surrounded by Chandaka forest with its hills and hillock on the south, north and west and Baranga Police station on its east at a distance of 0.5 km.

Orientation
The fort is oriented east-west longitudinally.

Architectural features
The fort has a rectangular plan that measures 1700 m x 1500 m, within which there are several ancient remains and ruins such as
i- Solapuri Uasa ( a palace of sixteen rooms)
ii-Chaula ghara ( granary) 
iii- water bodies
iv-religious shrines
Solapuri Uasa or the palace of sixteen rooms occupied an area of about 25 acres. On plan the remains extends over an area that measures 386 metres x 217 metres. It is said that, there were sixteen rooms inside the palace but the exploration could locate only nine blocks of various size. The largest one measured 141.00 m x 121.00 m with a height of 4.00 m and thickness of 2 .00 m. The smallest block measured 42.00 m x 34.00 m with a height 1.30 m and thickness of 1.80 m. Large sized dressed sandstone and laterite blocks have been used for the construction of the building. On the average these blocks measure 1.10 m x 1.30 m. Architectural remains like pillars fragments, lintels, and temple fragments like Chandrasilas, and stone blocks of hexagonal, octagonal, square shape are also found. In this area of the fort, there are the ruins of a temple that was made of sandstone. Towards the north-eastern corner of the fort and south of Chudanga jhil, large quantity of charred rice are found, which is locally known as Chaula ghara or The Granary. This patch of land is under the cultivation. One of the important features of this fort is the presence of large number of water bodies such as
 Chudanga jhil
 Cheddagadia
 Gangua
 Nahuagenja
 Bada pokhari
 Sana pokhari
 Khiragadia
 Kiakani jhil
 Kanjia jhil
 Dubala chhatra
 Routa gadia
 Rani gadhua pokhari
 Hati gadhua pokhari
 Bhai bahu dedhasura pokhari
 Padma pokhari.

Building material
The fort is made up of sandstone & laterite.

Construction
Dry masonry

Special features
Large number of water bodies are also found in the fort area.

State of preservation
The site, though protected, has largely been encroached upon by local cultivators.

Threats to the property

Conservation problem and remedies
i- The fort is encroached by the local cultivators and residents. There are near about 50 houses with a population of 300 people inside the fort area.
ii- Besides that, some years before a Bengali contractor removed large number of stones from the protection wall of Solapuri uasa for the construction of a canal. The site is covered by a compound wall made of laterite that measures 1700 m in length x
1500 m in width, with a thickness of 2.30 m and height of 14.00 m as available at present.

Other archaeological findings
Among other archaeological findings of the site are potteries, and iron objects
i- Potteries like Red ware, Red-slip ware, Black ware, Black slipped ware etc.
ii- Iron objects like iron clamps, iron hooks, nails, daggers, swords, arrow heads etc.
iii- Fragment of a stone ware, broken pieces of lamps and broken pieces of a Udyota simha

References 

 Lesser Known Monuments of Bhubaneswar by Dr. Sadasiba Pradhan
 List of Hindu temples in India

Forts in Odisha